The 1998-I Pre-Libertadores tournament was the first edition of the Pre-Libertadores tournament, the annual football competition contested by teams from Venezuela and Mexico, that defined two teams qualified for the Copa Libertadores. It was held from 4 to 26 February 2022.

The tournament was contested by two teams from Venezuela, Caracas–Atlético Zulia, and two teams from Mexico, América–Guadalajara. The top two teams qualified for the 1998 Copa Libertadores where they joined Brazilian teams Grêmio and Vasco da Gama in the group 2 of the competition.

Participating teams
Originally, the two Mexican teams were to be determined in a preliminary final four organized by the Mexican Football Federation between América, Guadalajara, Cruz Azul and Atlante. However, Cruz Azul and Atlante declined to participate, leaving America and Guadalajara to advance directly to the Pre-Libertadores.

The two Venezuelan teams were the champions and runners-up of the 1996–97 Venezuelan Primera División season.

Note

Results

Standings

Matches
The match schedule had to be reduced to avoid a clash with the start of the 2018 Copa Libertadores (25 February), so matches between teams from the same country were omitted. Each team played a total of 4 matches.

Goalscorers

References

1
1